Chitra Shenoy is an Indian actress and producer in South Indian movies and television series. She has acted in more than 600 films in Kannada, Malayalam, Tamil, Telugu, Tulu, and Hindi. She is known as the 'young mother' in the Kannada film industry having portrayed the role of a mother to almost all top stars in Kannada. In Malayalam she rose to fame with her role as Mammootty's mother in Rajamanikyam.

She became a house-hold name in Kerala playing the villainous mother-in-law character in the Malayalam serial Sthreedhanam. She owns the production company Good Company Productions.

Personal life
She was born in a Sankethi Brahmin family to M. K. Vinayak and Saraswathi, as the youngest of two children at Hassan. She has an elder sister, Jyothi. She is a home science graduate. She is married to Gurudas Shenoy, a Kannada Film & Television Producer. They have a daughter Kushi Shenoy. Gurudas & Chitra Shenoy together run two television production companies - Dakshin Videotech and Good Company Productions. She currently resides at Bangalore with her family.

Filmography

Television series

Awards

Won
Film Fans Best Supporting Actress Award-1999 from Chennai for the film "Chaitrada Chiguru".
Sir.M.Visvesvaraya National Mahila Sreeratna Award-2000 at Mantralayam.
Arybhatta Award as a producer for “Kshamaya Dharithtri”
Asianet television award for Most popular actress 2013
Asianet television award for Best Character actress (Special Jury mention) 2014
Asianet television award for Most popular actress 2015
Nominated
Asianet television award for Best Character actress 2013
Asianet television award for Best Character actress 2014
Asianet television award for Most popular actress 2014
Asianet television award for Best Character actress 2015
2nd IIFA Utsavam for performance in a Supporting role female-Kannada 2017

Reality Shows
 Munch Stars (Asianet)
 Ningalkkumakam Kodeeswaran (Asianet)
 Sell Me The Answer (Asianet)
Badai Bungalow (Asianet)
Kumkumam (Kairali TV)

References

External links

Actresses from Bangalore
Indian film actresses
Actresses in Malayalam cinema
Actresses in Kannada cinema
Living people
People from Hassan
Indian television actresses
Actresses in Malayalam television
Actresses in Kannada television
Actresses in Tamil television
21st-century Indian actresses
1978 births
Actresses in Tulu cinema
Actresses in Telugu cinema
Actresses in Tamil cinema
Actresses in Hindi television